Ha-102 may refer to:

 , an Imperial Japanese Navy submarine in commission from 1944 to 1945
  Mitsubishi Ha102, an alternative name for the Mitsubishi Zuisei aircraft engine